Leishmania infantum is the causative agent of infantile visceral leishmaniasis in the Mediterranean region and in Latin America, where it has been called Leishmania chagasi. It is also an unusual cause of cutaneous leishmaniasis, which is normally caused by specific lineages (or zymodemes). Wild canids and domestic dogs are the natural reservoir of this organism. The sandfly species Lutzomyia longipalpis serves as the primary vector for the transmission of the disease.

Leishmania infantum is closely related to Leishmania donovani, and some authors believe that these two species are so close as to actually be subspecies of each other; however, phylogenetic analyses can easily distinguish between the two groups despite no difference in morphology in the species complex. Some isolates formerly labelled L. donovani may be actually L. infantum.

Model system for studies of DNA repair
Comparative bioinformatic analyses showed that the size of the L. infantum BRCA2 protein is approximately three times smaller (125 kD) than its human counterpart. Furthermore, analyses revealed that LiBRCA2 possesses key features of the BRCA2 family. The smaller size of the Leishmania BRCA2 DNA repair protein has been exploited to better understand its function in homologous recombination and its interaction with the LiRAD51 recombinase.

References

External links

 

Parasitic excavates
Trypanosomatida